In mathematics, in the field of control theory, a Sylvester equation  is a matrix equation of the form:

Then given matrices A, B, and C, the problem is to find the possible matrices X that obey this equation. All matrices are assumed to have coefficients in the complex numbers. For the equation to make sense, the matrices must have appropriate sizes, for example they could all be square matrices of the same size. But more generally, A and B must be square matrices of sizes n and m respectively, and then X and C both have n rows and m columns.

A Sylvester equation has a unique solution for X exactly when there are no common eigenvalues of A and −B.
More generally, the equation AX + XB = C has been considered as an equation of bounded operators on a (possibly infinite-dimensional) Banach space. In this case, the condition for the uniqueness of a solution X is almost the same: There exists a unique solution X exactly when the spectra of A and −B are disjoint.

Existence and uniqueness of the solutions
Using the Kronecker product notation and the vectorization operator , we can rewrite Sylvester's equation in the form

In this form, the equation can be seen as a linear system of dimension .

Theorem. 

Proof. 
The equation  is a linear system with  unknowns and the same amount of equations. Hence it is uniquely solvable for any given  if and only if the homogeneous equation 

admits only the trivial solution .

(i) Assume that  and  do not share any eigenvalue. Let  be a solution to the abovementioned homogeneous equation. Then , which can be lifted to 

for each 
by mathematical induction. Consequently,

for any polynomial . Then 
 
due to the Cayley-Hamilton theorem; meanwhile, the spectral mapping theorem tells us

where  denotes the spectrum of a matrix. Since  and  do not share any eigenvalue,  does not contain zero, and hence  is nonsingular. Thus  as desired. This proves the "if" part of the theorem.

(ii) Now assume that  and  share an eigenvalue . Then , and 

Hence  is a nontrivial solution to the aforesaid homogeneous equation, justifying the "only if" part of the theorem. Q.E.D.

Hence there exist polynomials  and  such that . By the Cayley–Hamilton theorem, . Thus , implying that  is nonsingular.

The theorem remains true for real matrices with the caveat that one considers their complex eigenvalues. The proof for the "if" part is still applicable; for the "only if" part, note that both  and  satisfy the homogenous equation , and they cannot be zero simultaneously.

Roth's removal rule

The answer is that these two matrices are similar exactly when there exists a matrix X such that AX − XB = C. In other words, X is a solution to a Sylvester equation. This is known as Roth's removal rule.

One easily checks one direction: If AX − XB = C then 

Roth's removal rule does not generalize to infinite-dimensional bounded operators on a Banach space.

Numerical solutions
A classical algorithm for the numerical solution of the Sylvester equation is the Bartels–Stewart algorithm, which consists of transforming  and  into Schur form by a QR algorithm, and then solving the resulting triangular system via back-substitution. This algorithm, whose computational cost is  arithmetical operations, is used, among others, by LAPACK and the lyap function in GNU Octave. See also the sylvester function in that language. In some specific image processing application, the derived Sylvester equation has a closed form solution.

See also
 Lyapunov equation
 Algebraic Riccati equation

Notes

References

External links
 Online solver for arbitrary sized matrices. 
 Mathematica function to solve the Sylvester equation
 MATLAB function to solve the Sylvester equation

Matrices
Control theory